The Totally Football Show presented by James Richardson is a thrice weekly podcast about association football produced by Muddy Knees Media. From June 15, 2020 it was incorporated into and also available via The Athletic. It regularly features on lists of the best association football podcasts.

The podcast was an off-shoot of The Guardian newspaper's Football Weekly podcast from which presenter Richardson, Producer Ben, and regular contributor Iain Macintosh left in order to create their own product ahead of the 2017–18 season. The new shows received five million downloads in their first two months. Throughout the 2017–18 season 26 million downloads were reported. For the 2018–19 season the 'Totally Football Show' will be sponsoring the football shirts of Melchester Rovers in the re-boot of the Roy of the Rovers graphic novels.

As well as the flagship Totally Football Show, the Totally Football League show and Golazo: the Totally Italian Football Show, the Totally Football League Show, and the Totally Scottish Football Show are also weekly podcasts co-produced by Audio Boom who reportedly saw their profits increase by 329% in 2017. The Totally Football Show: American Edition was launched in October 2018 hosted by US soccer record caps holder Cobi Jones. It ended after MLS Cup was handed out that season.

The Monday and Thursday editions of the show typically focus on news around the English Premier League. The Tuesday edition of the show, known as the "European edition," usually focuses on Serie A, La Liga, the German Bundesliga and Ligue 1, as well as the UEFA Champions League and any other European leagues making news the previous weekend, with Richardson regularly joined by contributors James Horncastle, Raphael Honigstein, Julien Laurens and Alvaro Romeo.

There are also Totally Football Live shows held at venues such as The O2 in London. They were nominated for ‘podcast of the year’ at the 2017 Football Supporters Federation Awards. On 31 October 2018, it was announced that The Totally Football Show has been nominated in the ‘podcast of the year’ category at the 2018 Football Supporters Federation Awards. On 10 April 2019 the show was nominated in the ‘Best Sport Podcast’ category at the British Podcast Awards which it subsequently won. In June 2020, Muddy Knees Media and The Totally Football Show became part of The Athletic. The Totally Football Show was shortlisted for the Podcast of the Year at the Football Supporters' Association awards in 2021. In February 2023 the show was nominated in the Podcast category at the British Sports Journalism Awards.

Regular contributors

Duncan Alexander
Carl Anka
Caroline Barker
Kelly Cates
Adrian Clarke
Michael Cox
Matt Davies-Adams
Natalie Gedra
Sasha Guryanov
Raphael Honigstein
Lynsey Hooper
James Horncastle
Richard Hughes
Adam Hurrey
Jack Lang
Julien Laurens
Flo Lloyd-Hughes
Iain Macintosh
Gabriele Marcotti
Bassil Mikdadi
Pat Nevin
Sam Parkin
David Preece
Alvaro Romeo
Daniel Storey
Tom Williams

References

Audio podcasts
Football mass media in the United Kingdom
2017 podcast debuts
Sports podcasts